Gombe or La Gombe is a municipality (commune) in the Lukunga district of Kinshasa, the capital city of the Democratic Republic of the Congo. It was formerly known as Kalina, after Lieutenant E. Kallina - an Austro-Hungarian soldier who volunteered in the Congo Free State. Gombe is bounded on the north by the Congo River and in the south by the Boulevard du 30 Juin.

Gombe is both a residential area and Kinshasa's business district. Originally the place that housed colonial administrative offices, cités indigènes, neighborhoods meant for non-colonists, formed around the neighborhood.

Government and infrastructure
It also houses some of the DRC's principal governing bodies, including the Palais de la Nation and the Banque Centrale du Congo on the Boulevard Colonel Tshatshi. Various ministries, diplomatic and media organizations are also situated there.

The offices of Kinshasa's governor are located in Gombe, making it the capital of Kinshasa Province.

The Direction Générale de Migration (DGM) of the Ministry of the Interior and Security is in Gombe. The headquarters of the Bureau Permanent d’Enquêtes d’Accidents et Incidents d’Aviation (BPEA), an agency of the Ministry of Transport and Channels of Communication, are also in Gombe.

Economy
Stellar Airways has its head office in Gombe.

Education

Both campuses of the French international school, Lycée Français René Descartes Kinshasa, are in Gombe: Site Gombe and Site Kalemie; the latter is across from the residence of the Ambassador of France.

Lycée Prince de Liège, a Belgian international school, is in Gombe.

Demographics

See also

References 

Communes of Kinshasa
Lukunga District